Christina Gerhardt is an author, academic and journalist. She has written on a range of subjects, including the environment, film and critical theory. She has been the Currie C. and Thomas A. Barron Visiting Professor of Environment and the Humanities at the High Meadows Environmental Institute at Princeton University, and held visiting positions at Harvard University, the Free University of Berlin, Columbia University and University of California at Berkeley, where she taught previously and is now a permanent Senior Fellow. She has been awarded grants from the Fulbright Commission, the DAAD, the National Endowment for the Humanities, and the Newberry Library. Her journalism has been published (under Tina Gerhardt) in Grist, The Nation, The Progressive and Sierra Magazine, among other venues.

Writing
Gerhardt has made contributions to a number of fields, notably the environmental humanities, film studies and critical theory.

Environmental Humanities

Professor Gerhardt is Editor-in-Chief of ISLE: Interdisciplinary Studies in Literature and Environment, the quarterly journal of the Association for the Study of Literature and Environment (ASLE), published by Oxford University Press. Gerhardt has written about walking and experiential learning, civic engagement and citizen science; about human-animal-environment entanglement; about petro-cultures and petro-landscapes, e.g. plastic and the Pacific; about sea level rise and islands; and about future shorelines. She also uses site specific public art installations to foster civic engagement. She has led  walking tours, with both classes and the public, revealing the past histories of urban landscapes, considering how the present-day environment came to be shaped, and imagining possible futures.

Film Studies

Gerhardt has written about new wave cinemas of the long sixties, including feminist and political cinema, about the representation of the Red Army Faction in film, about New German Cinema and the Berlin School, and about directors ranging from Helke Sander and Harun Farocki to Rainer Werner Fassbinder and Hito Steyerl.

Critical theory
Gerhardt has published on critical theory and on Theodor W. Adorno. Her writings examine the concept of nature and of animals in the writings of the Frankfurt School's first generation. She has published articles on Adorno and nature; on nature in Adorno and Kracauer; on animals and compassion in the writings of Adorno, Horkheimer and Schopenhauer; and on animals in Adorno, Cixous, Derrida and Levinas.

Awards
DAAD Faculty Research Award
Fulbright Commission - Junior Research Grant

Selected publications

Books
Sea Change: An Atlas of Islands in a Rising Ocean, 2023.
Screening the Red Army Faction: Historical and Cultural Memory, 2018. pb 2020.

Edited volumes
Celluloid Revolt: German Screen Cultures and the Long 1968. 2019
1968 and Global Cinema. 2018

Special Issues
The Authoritarian Personality, Co-Editor, with Robyn Marasco and Kirk Wetters, special issue of [Polity], 2022
1968 and West German Cinema, Editor, special issue of The Sixties: A Journal of History, Politics and Culture, 2017
Adorno and Ethics, Editor, special issue of New German Critique, 2006

Environmental Humanities - Recent Articles and Book Chapters
 "Postcolonial Cartographies, Environmental Humanities and Sea Level Rise" in Teaching Postcolonial Environmental Literature and Media. Edited by Cajetan Iheka. MLA Series: Options for Teaching, 2021. pp. 119-128.
 "Back to the Future or Forward to the Past: Ocean Voyaging and Slow Travel." in Studies in 20th & 21st Century Literature. Edited by Peter Arnds. 44.1 (2020).
 "Sea Level Rise, Marshall Islands and Environmental Justice." in Climate Justice and Community Renewal: Resistance and Grassroots Solutions. Edited by Brian Tokar and Tamra Gilbertson. Routledge, 2020. pp. 70–81.
 "Liquidity Incorporated: Economic Tides and Fluid Data in Hito Steyerl's Liquidity, Inc." Co-authored with Jaimey Hamilton Faris. In Makes Waves: Water in Contemporary Literature and Film. Edited by Paula Anca Farca. University of Nevada Press, 2019. pp. 12–21.
 "Travel Writing and Post-Colonial Critique: Schalansky's Atlas of Remote Islands." in Anxious Journey: Twenty-First Century Travel Writing in German. Co-Edited by Karin Baumgartner and Monika Shafi. Camden House, 2019. pp. 193–206.
 "Plastic and the Pacific: Midway Atoll, Plastiglomerate and Love of Place." in Mosaic 51.3 (2018): 123–140.
 "Walking, We Ask Questions: Experiential Learning and Environmental Humanities." in Environment and Pedagogy in Higher Education. Edited by Lucie Viakinnou-Brinson. Lexington Books, 2018. pp. 133–151.

Film - Recent Articles and Book Chapters 

 Christina Gerhardt and Marco Abel. "Introduction: German Screen Cultures and the Long 1968." in Celluloid Revolt: German Screen Cultures and the Long 1968. Co-Edited by Christina Gerhardt and Marco Abel. Camden House, 2019. pp. 1–23.
 Christina Gerhardt. "Helke Sander's dffb Films and the West German Feminist Movement." in Celluloid Revolt: German Screen Cultures and the Long 1968. Co-Edited by Christina Gerhardt and Marco Abel. Camden House, 2019. pp. 69–86.
 Christina Gerhardt and Sara Saljoughi. "Looking Back: Global Cinema and the Legacy of New Waves around 1968." in 1968 and Global Cinema. Co-Edited by Christina Gerhardt and Sara Saljoughi. Wayne State University Press, 2018. pp. 1–20.
 "Internationalism and the Early Student Films of the German Film and Television Academy Berlin (dffb)." in 1968 and Global Cinema. Co-Edited by Christina Gerhardt and Sara Saljoughi. Wayne State University Press, 2018. pp. 96–116.
 "On Liberated Women in an Un-Liberated Society: Ula Stöckl's The Cat Has Nine Lives (1968)." in Women, Global Protest Movements and Political Agency: Rethinking the Legacy of 1968. Co-Edited by Sarah Colvin and Katharina Karcher. Routledge, 2018. pp. 69–83.

References

External links 

Tina Gerhardt at The Nation
Tina Gerhardt at Grist.org
Tina Gerhardt at The Progressive

Year of birth missing (living people)
Living people